The Karnataka State Film Award for Best Book on Kannada Cinema is a state film award of the Indian state of Karnataka given during the annual Karnataka State Film Awards. The award honors the authors who wrote the books related to the topics of Kannada Cinema.

Winners

References

Karnataka State Film Awards